is the fourth studio album by Japanese heavy metal band Loudness. It was recorded, mixed and mastered in London, England, in 1983 and released at the beginning of 1984. The sound engineer chosen for the recording sessions was the expert Julian Mendelsohn, who had previously worked with acts like Yes, Elton John, Jimmy Page and Bob Marley. The original Japanese version was licensed and released by Music for Nations in the UK and Roadrunner Records in Europe. Attention by major US labels for the band and the need to make their work accessible to Western audiences, prompted a new release of the album with vocal tracks sung in English on July 1, 1984. The English version opened the album with the instrumental "Anthem (Loudness Overture)" by Akira Takasaki, which was missing in the original Japanese release.

Critical reception 

In 2005, Disillusion was ranked number 290 in Rock Hard magazine's book of The 500 Greatest Rock & Metal Albums of All Time. In September 2007, Rolling Stone Japan rated Disillusion No. 40 on its list of the "100 Greatest Japanese Rock Albums of All Time". In 2019, "Exploder" was named the 21st best guitar instrumental by Young Guitar Magazine.

Track listing 
All music composed by Akira Takasaki, all lyrics by Minoru Niihara. English lyrics by Tommy McClendon.
Side one
"Crazy Doctor" – 4:13
"Esper" – 3:45
"Butterfly" – 5:12
"Revelation" – 4:19

Side two
"Exploder" (instrumental) – 2:29
"Dream Fantasy" – 4:34
"Milky Way" – 4:17
"Satisfaction Guaranteed" – 3:39
"Ares' Lament" – 5:30

2004 Japanese CD edition bonus tracks
"Crazy Doctor" (live English version) – 4:18
"Dream Fantasy" (live English version) – 4:37

2005 Japanese "Disillusion (English version)" CD edition bonus tracks
"Eruption" – 3:14
"Flash Out" – 4:07

Personnel 
Loudness
Minoru Niihara – vocals
Akira Takasaki – guitars
Masayoshi Yamashita – bass, Taurus pedals
Munetaka Higuchi – drums

Production
Julian Mendelsohn – engineer
Stuart Bruce – assistant engineer
Geoff Pesche – mastering at Tape One Studios, London
Mikio Shimizu, Toshi Nakashita – executive producers

References 

1984 albums
Loudness (band) albums
Nippon Columbia albums
Music for Nations albums
Japanese-language albums